Kristy Louise McBain (born 29 September 1982) is an Australian politician. She currently represents the division of Eden-Monaro, and is the Minister for Regional Development, Local Government and Territories.

Personal life
McBain was born in Traralgon, Victoria. Her family moved to the Bega Valley in the 1990s and ran a small sporting store in Merimbula.

McBain attended Eden Marine High School, before completing a double degree in Law/Communications at the University of Canberra.

McBain met her husband Brad in high school and runs a small plumbing business. They and their three children live in Tura Beach.

Political career
McBain became a councillor for Bega Valley Shire in September 2012 and became the mayor in September 2016.

McBain resigned as mayor and councillor in March 2020 to contest the July 2020 Eden-Monaro by-election for the Labor Party. She won the seat for the party with 50.4% of the two-party-preferred vote and was sworn in as a member of parliament on 24 August 2020.

References

External links
Australian Parliament biography

1982 births
Living people
Labor Right politicians
Australian Labor Party members of the Parliament of Australia
Members of the Australian House of Representatives
Members of the Australian House of Representatives for Eden-Monaro
Women members of the Australian House of Representatives
University of Canberra alumni
21st-century Australian lawyers
21st-century Australian politicians
21st-century Australian women politicians
Mayors of places in New South Wales
Women mayors of places in New South Wales